The ruble (alternatively rubel or rouble; ; abbreviation: Rbl (plural: Rbls); ISO code: BYN) is the currency of Belarus. The ruble is subdivided into 100 kopecks.

History

First ruble, 1992–2000
As a result of the breakup of the supply chain in the former Soviet enterprises, goods started to be bought and sold in the market, often requiring cash settlement. The Belarusian unit of the USSR State Bank had neither the capacity nor the licence to print Soviet banknotes, so the government decided to introduce its own national currency to ease the cash situation. The German word Thaler, divided into 100 Groschen was suggested as the name for a Belarusian currency, but the Communist majority in the Supreme Soviet of Belarus rejected the proposal and stuck to the word ruble that had been used in Belarus from the times of the Soviet Union and the Russian Empire. The word ruble has also been used as a name for a currency in circulation in the medieval Grand Duchy of Lithuania, of which Belarus was a major part (see Lithuanian long currency).

From the collapse of the Soviet Union until May 1992, the Soviet ruble circulated in Belarus alongside the Belarusian ruble. New Russian banknotes also circulated in Belarus, but were replaced by notes issued by the National Bank of the Republic of Belarus in May 1992. The first post-Soviet Belarusian ruble was assigned the ISO code BYB and replaced the Soviet currency at the rate of 1 Belarusian ruble = 10 Soviet rubles. It took about two years before the ruble became the official currency of the country.

Second ruble, 2000–2016
In 2000, a new ruble was introduced (ISO 4217 code BYR), replacing the first at a rate of 1 BYR = 1,000 BYB. This was redenomination with three zeros removed. Only banknotes were issued; coins were minted solely as commemorative collectibles.

Monetary integration with Russia
From the beginning of his presidency in 1994, Alexander Lukashenko began to suggest the idea of integration with the Russian Federation, and undertook steps in this direction. The idea of introducing a united currency for the Union of Russia and Belarus was floated; Article 13 of the 1999 "Treaty of Creation of the Union State of Russia and Belarus" foresaw a unified currency. Belarus' economy was largely a Soviet-style centrally controlled one heavily reliant on cheap energy supplies from Russia. Discussions on the common currency continued well past the 2005 implementation goal set by both nations. Starting in 2008, the Central Bank of Belarus announced that the ruble would be tied to the United States dollar instead of the Russian ruble. Former bank chairman Stanislav Bogdankevich called it a political decision, tied to Belarus' open displeasure with Russia's hike of oil and gas export prices to Belarus earlier that year.

Third ruble, 2016–present
In July 2016, a new ruble was introduced (ISO 4217 code BYN), at a rate of 1 BYN = 10,000 BYR. Old and new rubles circulated in parallel from 1 July to 31 December 2016. Belarus also issued coins for general circulation for the first time. Seven banknote denominations (5-, 10-, 20-, 50-, 100-, 200-, and 500 rubles) and eight coin denominations (1-, 2-, 5-, 10-, 20-, and 50 copecks, and 1- and 2 rubles) are in circulation as of 1 July 2016. The banknotes have security threads and show 2009 as an issue date (the date of an unsuccessful attempt at currency reform).

Coins

First series, 2016
On December 27, 2016, for the first time in the Belarusian ruble's history, coins were introduced, due to the redenomination. Previously, Belarus was one of the few countries in the world never to have issued coins; this was largely due to rampant inflation, a problem since independence.

Slovakia offered to mint the coins, and provided prototypes. Coins of up to 5 copecks are struck in copper-plated steel; 10, 20, and 50 copeck coins are struck in brass-plated steel; 1 ruble coins are nickel-plated steel and 2 ruble coins a bi-metallic composition with a brass-plated steel ring and a nickel-plated steel center plug). All coins show the national emblem of Belarus, the inscription 'БЕЛАРУСЬ' (Belarus) and the year of minting on their obverse. The reverse shows the value of the coin and different symbolic ornaments.

Commemorative issues

Belarus is a large producer of commemorative coinage for the numismatic market, most particularly gold and silver bullion coins and non-circulating legal tender. Their designs range from fairly commonplace to unique and innovative ONE; themes range from "native culture and events" to fairy tales and pop culture topics unrelated to Belarus. A majority of these coins have a face value of 1 ruble; a few are 3-, 5 rubles and higher. Considered novelties, these coins are unlikely to be seen in general circulation.

Banknotes

First ruble
In 1992, banknotes were introduced in denominations of 50 copecks, and 1, 3, 5, 10, 25, 50, 100, 200, 500, 1,000, and 5,000 rubles. These were followed by banknotes of 20,000 rubles in 1994, 50,000 rubles in 1995, 100,000 rubles in 1996, 500,000 rubles in 1998 and 1,000,000 and 5,000,000 rubles in 1999.

Second ruble
In 2000, notes were introduced in denominations of 1, 5, 10, 20, 50, 100, 500, 1,000, and 5,000 rubles. In 2001, higher denominations of 10,000, 20,000, and 50,000 rubels were introduced, followed by 100,000 rubles in 2005 and 200,000 rubles in 2012. There were no coins or banknotes issued in copecks.

"On 1 September 2010, new rules of Belarusian orthography came into force. According to the old rules, the correct spelling of the word “fifty” in Belarusian was “пяцьдзесят,” (pyats'dzesyat) but under the new rules, it should be spelled “пяцьдзясят,” (pyats'dzyasyat) the difference being that the seventh character was the Cyrillic letter YE but is now the Cyrillic letter YA. As a result of these new rules, the existing 50 and 50,000 ruble notes dated 2000 now technically contain errors where the denominations are spelled out on the notes. On 29 December 2010, the National Bank of Belarus introduced new 50- and 50,000-ruble banknotes to bring the inscriptions on the notes into compliance with the new rules of Belarusian spelling and punctuation. The images, colors, and sizes of the notes remain consistent with the preceding issues of the same denominations dated 2000. The modified 50 ruble notes also no longer has a security thread, and the modified 50,000 ruble notes have replaced the solid security thread for a 2mm-wide windowed security thread."

Third ruble
In 2016, banknotes were introduced in denominations of 5-, 10-, 20-, 50-, 100-, 200-, and 500 rubles. On 4 November 2015, the National Bank of the Republic of Belarus announced that the banknotes that had been in use at that time would be replaced by the new ones due to the upcoming redenomination. The redenomination would be made in a ratio of 1:10,000 (10,000 rubles of the 2000 series = 1 ruble of the 2009 series). This currency reform also brought the introduction of coins, for the first time in The Republic of Belarus.

The banknotes are printed by the United Kingdom-based banknote manufacturer, security printing, paper-making and cash handling systems company De La Rue. As for coins, they have been minted by both the Lithuanian Mint and the Kremnica Mint. Both banknotes and coins have been ready in 2009, but the financial crisis prevented them from being put into circulation immediately, resulting in a 7-year delay conditional on the necessity to lower inflation. Their designs are very similar to the euro banknotes.

Exchange rates
On 2 January 2009, the National Bank of the Republic of Belarus lowered the exchange rate of the ruble by 50%.

On 24 May 2011, the National Bank of the Republic of Belarus lowered the exchange rate of the ruble by 56%. Alexei Moiseev, chief economist at Russia's VTB Capital, said at the time that "a '91-style meltdown is almost inevitable", referring to the crisis which accompanied the dissolution of the Soviet Union.

On 20 October 2011, the exchange rate of the ruble dropped 42% (from Rbl 5,712 to Rbl 8,680 per US$) when it was fully floated following demands to do so by Russia and the IMF.

In January 2015, the National Bank of the Republic of Belarus devalued its currency by 23% against the US dollar despite efforts to keep Russia's currency crisis from spreading across the border. As of 1 February, one U.S. dollar was worth Rbls 15,400; by Tuesday, it fell to Rbls 15,450 to the dollar, as per data from the Belarusian Central Bank's website.

As of mid-March 2022, the Belarusian ruble had reached an all-time low of Rbls 3.33 per US$1, during fallout from the 2022 Russian invasion of Ukraine. On 1 April 2022, it traded at Rbls 3.26 per US$, and had lost 21.5% of its value year-to-date. By 8 October 2022, it had recovered.

See also
 Economy of Belarus
 Lithuanian long currency - the Lithuanian ruble, the currency in medieval Belarus
 Ruble

References

External links

 National bank of the Republic of Belarus - Official Exchange Rates (English)
 Information about Belarusian commemorative coins (English)
 Catalog of Belarus Banknotes 
 LIVE Belarus Ruble eXchange Rates : BYR (English)
 
 Complete Gallery of Belarus Banknotes (issued and unissued)

Currencies of Europe
Economy of Belarus
Fixed exchange rate
Currencies introduced in 1992